The Sixth Oklahoma Legislature was a meeting of the legislative branch of the government of Oklahoma, composed of the Oklahoma Senate and the Oklahoma House of Representatives. The state legislature met in Oklahoma City, in regular session from January 2 to March 16, 1917, during the third year of the term of Governor Robert L. Williams.

Lieutenant Governor Martin E. Trapp served as the President of the Senate and C. W. Board served as the President pro tempore of the Oklahoma Senate. Paul Nesbitt served as Speaker of the Oklahoma House of Representatives.

Dates of sessions
Regular session: January 2-March 16, 1917
Previous: 5th Legislature • Next: 7th Legislature

Major legislation
Senate Bill 55 prohibited alcohol and made the penalty $500 and six months imprisonment. After it was enacted, the bill was challenged because it failed to exempt liquor distribution for sacramental use in churches and the Oklahoma Supreme Court ruled on May 21, 1918, that the sacramental use of liquor would be exempt. A December ruling said individuals could possess liquor as long as it was not received form a common carrier.

Party composition

Senate

House of Representatives

Leadership

Senate
Lieutenant Governor Martin E. Trapp served as the President of the Senate, which gave him a tie-breaking vote and allowed him to serve as a presiding officer. C.W. Board was elected by state senators to serve as the President pro tempore of the Oklahoma Senate, the primary presiding officer of the Oklahoma Senate.

House
Paul Nesbitt of McAlester, Oklahoma, served as Speaker of the Oklahoma House of Representatives and Tom L. Waldrep of Shawnee, Oklahoma, served as Speaker Pro Tempore.

Members

Senate

Table based on state almanac and list of all senators.

House of Representatives

Table based on government database.

References

External links
Oklahoma Legislature
Oklahoma House of Representatives
Oklahoma Senate

Oklahoma legislative sessions
1917 in Oklahoma
1918 in Oklahoma
1917 U.S. legislative sessions
1918 U.S. legislative sessions